The 2022 Arkansas Razorbacks baseball team represented the University of Arkansas in the 2022 NCAA Division I baseball season. The Razorbacks played their home games at Baum–Walker Stadium.

Previous season

The Razorbacks finished 50–13, 22–8 in the SEC to win the regular season conference title. The Razorbacks also went on to win the 2021 Southeastern Conference baseball tournament. They entered the NCAA tournament as the #1 seed. They hosted the Fayetteville Regional and went 3–1 to advance to Super Regionals. The Razorbacks hosted the Fayetteville Super Regional in which they lost to NC State to close their season.

Schedule and results

Standings

Postseason
Arkansas finished in second place in the SEC West, and lost back-to-back games in the SEC Tournament. But the team would go on a run in the NCAA tournament, winning the Stillwater Regional over the host Oklahoma State Cowboys. The Razorbacks would also win the Chapel Hill Super Regional in Chapel Hill, NC over North Carolina, which would send them to the 2022 College World Series. The Razorbacks would finish 3rd in the CWS going 3-2, and finishing with an overall record of 46-21.

Awards
Arkansas placed two players on the SEC All-Defensive Team: SP Connor Noland and 2B Robert Moore. 

Arkansas also placed two players on the Freshman All-SEC Team: RP Brady Tygart and SP Hagen Smith. 

Catcher Michael Turner was named the MVP of the Stillwater Regional. 
In addition to Turner, Connor Noland, Jalen Battles, Peyton Stovall, and Cayden Wallace were all named to the Stillwater All-Regional Team.

2nd baseman Robert Moore also became Arkansas' first ever winner of the Rawlings Gold Glove Award, which is given to the best defensive player at each position nationally.

Results

See also
2022 Arkansas Razorbacks softball team

References

Arkansas
Arkansas Razorbacks baseball seasons
Arkansas Razorbacks baseball
College World Series seasons
2022 NCAA Division I baseball tournament participants